That Girl is a 1960s American television sitcom.

That Girl may also refer to:

 That Girl (album), by Jennifer Nettles, 2014

Songs
 "That Girl" (Esthero song), 1999
 "That Girl" (Frankie J song), 2006
 "That Girl" (Jennifer Nettles song), 2013
 "That Girl" (Jung Yong-hwa song), 2017
 "That Girl" (Marques Houston song), 2003
 "That Girl" (Maxi Priest song), 1996
 "That Girl" (McFly song), 2004
 "That Girl" (Miranda Murphy song), 2004
 "That Girl" (Mischa Daniels song), 2012
 "That Girl" (Noisettes song), 2012
 "That Girl" (Pharrell Williams song), 2006
 "That Girl" (Stevie Wonder song), 1981
 "That Girl", by Andy Kim, 1968
 "That Girl", by Bad Company from Fame and Fortune, 1986
 "That Girl", by Bone Thugs from New Waves, 2017
 "That Girl", by David Choi, 2010
 "That Girl", by FM from Indiscreet, 1986
 "That Girl", by Justin Timberlake from The 20/20 Experience, 2013
 "That Girl", by NLT, 2007
 "That Girl", by Olly Murs from 24 Hrs, 2016
 "That Girl", by Plain White T's from Big Bad World, 2008
 "That Girl", by Raven-Symoné from Raven-Symoné, 2008
 "That Girl", by Tegan and Sara from Love You to Death, 2016

See also
 Who's That Girl? (disambiguation)
 This Girl (disambiguation)